is a Prefectural Natural Park in southeast Hyōgo Prefecture, Japan. Established in 1957, the park spans the municipalities of Inagawa, Kawanishi and Sasayama.

See also
 National Parks of Japan
 Taki Renzan Prefectural Natural Park

References

Parks and gardens in Hyōgo Prefecture
Protected areas established in 1957
1957 establishments in Japan